The Savoia-Marchetti SM.105 was a projected Italian four-engine military and civil transport aircraft of the post-World War II period.

Design
The SM.105 was initially designed as an improved version of the SM.104, but following the release of concepts of the Fairchild XC-120 and Miles M.68, the SM.105 was redesigned with a detachable cargo section with a capacity of 64 m³ (2,260 ft³). The cockpit was above the cargo bay. There were large doors both forward and aft. The useful load comprised eight horses and four assistants, or two cars. A civil version had 40 seats and a bar, with a fully glassed nose to "assure an uncommon view".

The most unusual feature of the aircraft was the detachable central fuselage, leaving the cockpit in the middle of the wing, similar to the CH-54 Tarhe helicopter of the 1960s. However conditions in 1947 were not favourable to this new project.

Specifications (SM.105 estimated)

References
 Lembo, Daniele, I bifusoliera della Regia, Storia militare magazine, Westward editions, n.11, April–May 2000 

SM.105
1940s Italian military transport aircraft
Abandoned military aircraft projects of Italy
Modular aircraft